Nicolette Rooimans (born 28 July 1968) is a Dutch former professional tennis player.

She has career-high WTA rankings of 249 in singles, achieved on 6 June 1988, and 245 in doubles, reached on 11 April 1988. Her twin sister Marielle former tennis players.

She made her WTA Tour main-draw debut at the 1988 Spanish Open.

ITF finals

Singles: 4 (2–2)

Doubles: 5 (3–2)

References

External links 
 
 

1968 births
Living people
Dutch female tennis players
20th-century Dutch women
20th-century Dutch people
21st-century Dutch women